Carenum tinctilatum (digger carab beetle) is a species of ground beetle in the subfamily Scaritinae. It was described by Newman in 1838. It is found in Australia.

References

tinctilatum
Beetles described in 1838